Roger Tchouassi (born 21 September 1986 in Côte d'Ivoire) is a Rwandan footballer.

Career
He played for the Police Kibungo and Djibouti Télécom. He made his international debut for Rwanda in 2010.

References

External links
Player profile - Footballdatabase.eu

1986 births
Living people
Association football forwards
Rwandan footballers
Rwanda international footballers
Rwandan expatriate footballers
Police F.C. (Rwanda) players
Expatriate footballers in Djibouti
AS Ali Sabieh/Djibouti Télécom players
Djibouti Premier League players
Rwandan expatriate sportspeople in Oman
Rwandan expatriate sportspeople in Djibouti
Expatriate footballers in Oman
Al-Shabab SC (Seeb) players